Night on Bröcken is the debut studio album by the American progressive metal band Fates Warning, released in September 1984 through Metal Blade Records.

The title of the album is apparently a reference to the Brocken, a mountain in Saxony-Anhalt, Germany, which is traditionally associated with witches (Walpurgis Night), most famously in Johann Wolfgang von Goethe's Faust (1806–1831). The reference becomes apparent on two original album covers that "were scrapped prior to major distribution". The spelling is a typical example of a "metal umlaut".

Reissues
Night on Bröcken has been reissued several times. The first edition, featuring the original cover art, was released only on vinyl and cassette. A CD edition with new cover art was released in 1988. A double compilation album, packaged together with The Spectre Within (1985), was released in 1992. A remastered edition of Night on Bröcken was released in 1994, followed by another in 2002; the latter containing four bonus tracks and restoring the original cover art, albeit with a different font.

Critical reception

Robert Taylor at AllMusic awarded Night on Bröcken two stars out of five, calling it "A very humble beginning for this excellent progressive band" but stopping short of actually recommending it for fans of progressive metal: "Metal fans will find this too close to Iron Maiden, and progressive fans should skip this altogether."

Track listing

Personnel
Fates Warning
John Arch – vocals, production
Jim Matheos – guitar, production
Victor Arduini – guitar, production
Joe DiBiase – bass, production
Steve Zimmerman – drums, production

Additional credits
mixed at Track Record, Los Angeles
Bill Metoyer, Brian Slagel – mixing
Doug Clark – engineering

References

Fates Warning albums
1984 debut albums
Metal Blade Records albums